Manzanate is a flavor ingredient which has a fruity apple smell and with aspects of cider and sweet pineapple.

References

Carboxylate esters
Ethyl esters

Sweet-smelling chemicals